Trupanea distincta is a species of tephritid or fruit flies in the genus Trupanea of the family Tephritidae.

Distribution
Taiwan.

References

Tephritinae
Insects described in 1931
Diptera of Asia